Niels Dahl (born 1 March 1937) is a Danish former sports shooter. He competed at the 1968 Summer Olympics and the 1976 Summer Olympics.

References

1937 births
Living people
Danish male sport shooters
Olympic shooters of Denmark
Shooters at the 1968 Summer Olympics
Shooters at the 1976 Summer Olympics
Sportspeople from Copenhagen